"Coño" is a cover song by American singer Jason Derulo and producers Puri and Jhorrmountain. It was released as a single on July 3, 2020 by Spinnin' Records. The song was written by Jason Derulo, Julmar Simons, Jhorano Plet, Gilian Chen, Akshe Puri and Shawn Charles. The original “Coño - Puri ft. Jhorrmountain & Adje” was released on December 8, 2017 and became a big hit in its country of origin, the Netherlands. The song even made it to the top 5 of most played summer hits of 2018 in The Netherlands.

Background

This version is the fourth release of the song, all iterations including production by Dutch producer/DJ Puri, and was preceded by the 2017 release “PURI X Jhorrmountain X Adje - Coño”, the 2018 remix “PURI X Sneakbo X Lisa Mercedez Feat. Jhorrmountain X Adje - Coño”, and the following 2019 release/remix “Ceky Viciny x Puri x El Bloonel - Coño”.

In an interview with Forbes, Derulo said, Coño' is a similar thing [to Derulo single ‘Savage Love’], some similar idea where I heard it and I thought it was fantastic. It's something that I know people are going to flip out over, and they have been flipping out over, but I believe that it needed a real chance to have a main stage, so I wrote a complete song to it with the producers. It's a wonderful collaboration. I think it'll be another massive moment. If clubs were actually out right now, I think it would be the premiere club track."

Personnel
Credits adapted from Tidal.

 Jason Derulo – producer, programmer, writer
 Jhorrmountain – producer, programmer
 Puri – producer, programmer, writer
 Gilian Chen – writer
 Jhorano Plet – writer
 Julmar Simons – writer
 Shawn Charles – writer

Charts

Weekly charts

Year-end charts

Certifications

Release history

References

2020 songs
2020 singles
Jason Derulo songs
Songs written by Jason Derulo
Spinnin' Records singles